Pegah Golpayegan (Persian: پگاه گلپایگان, Pegâh-e Gâlpayegân) is a dairy factory in Iran.

History
Pegah Golpayegan factory was purchased from the Republic of Bulgaria in 1973; in February 1983 it became operational, with a production capacity of 3 tons cheese daily under management of Iranian Dairy Products Industries Corporation. The surface area of land of this factory equaled 11 hectares, with over 10,000 m² of building. Pegah Golpayegan factory is the first established industrial unit for cheese production in the Islamic Republic of Iran.
 
In 1994 cheese production system in the industrial method was opened in the presence of first deputy of the president, and the facility had a production capacity of 25 tons cheese per day. The adopted technology for white cheese production line is a continuous coagulator made by the ALPMA Company of Germany. This system is one of the most advanced cheese production technologies; it can convert 10 tons of milks per hour.

Company products
The Processed cheese production line at Pegah Golpayegan is unique in Iran in that it can produce continually various types of processed cheese in sterile form with high durability and prolonged viability (one year). Currently package of this product is in triangular shape. Yogurt and water production line is also automatic having packaging capacity of 2,000 bottle per hour in various sizes. Among other factory products are pizza cheese, triangular and cup shaped package cream cheese, cream yogurt, ordinary yogurt, garlic contained dehydrated yogurt, industrial liquid dried whey, dried black curds, coca dairy dessert, pasteurized milk, cocoa milk, butter, rice milk, confectionery cream and animal oils.

Honors
In production and packaging of products by Pegah Golpayegan, no preservative or chemical flavouring agents are used. Successes obtained by the Pegah Golpayegan Pasteurized milk factory have been obtained 3 international authorized certificates as follows :
International Management Quality Standard ISO 9002 ( 1998 )
International Management Environmental Standard ISO 14001 ( 1998 )
Food Materials Safety Standard HACCP ( 2001 )

The factory has obtained the Iranian National Standard mark for producing white cheese, butter, yogurt and water and also has received numerous citations and letter of commendations from authorities and responsibles, different organizations, associations and festivals.

See also
 Golpayegan
 Iran Dairy Industries Co.

External links
Pegah Golpayegan official website

Dairy products companies of Iran
Wholesalers of Iran